Cionocups is an extinct genus of Ommatine beetle. It is known from a single species, Cionocups manukyani, found in Cenomanian aged Burmese amber from Myanmar. It was originally considered to be closely related to the genus Cionocoleus, but it is considered a junior synonym of Omma by some subsequent authors.

References 

Burmese amber
Ommatidae
Fossil taxa described in 2020
Prehistoric beetle genera